Arslanmyrat Amanmyradowiç Amanow (born March 28, 1990) is a Turkmen professional footballer who plays as a winger for Ahal, and captains the Turkmenistan national football team. He represented the nation at the 2019 AFC Asian Cup.

Personal life 
Arslanmyrat Amanov was born at Baýramaly in Mary Region. He started playing football at the School of Sports of Ashgabat.

Career
He started his professional career in 2007, FC Ashgabat, where he played for the first two years. From 2010 to 2012, he played for FC HTTU. Also during 2012, he played 11 matches and scored one goal in Kazakh club FC Okzhetpes.

During 2013, he returned to FC HTTU.

In March 2014, Amanov signed for Kazakhstan Premier League side FC Irtysh Pavlodar. After one season with Irtysh, Amanov left the club in December 2014. He played 24 matches as part of this club and scored 1 goal.

In 2015–2016, he played for Uzbek club Olmaliq, played 54 matches and managed to score 8 goals.

In 2017, he played for the FC Altyn Asyr. In 2018, he signed for another Uzbek club FK Buxoro.

On January 31, 2019, it was announced that he had signed for Uzbek champions PFC Lokomotiv Tashkent.

In the winter of 2020, Amanov signed a one-year contract with FC AGMK, in which he had already played in 2015 and 2016.

In January 2021, he signed with FC Sogdiana Jizzakh. In July, his contract with Sogdiana was terminated by mutual consent. He returned to homeland Turkmenistan, and joined FC Ahal.

International career 
Since 2009, he has played for the national team of Turkmenistan. He scored in the game against Tajikistan in 2010 AFC Challenge Cup Semi final.

Until now, he has played 53 games in his team and scored 10 goals meaning he holds the record for the most international caps of any Turkmen player. One of the vice-captains of the team.

In December 2018, he was included in the bid for the Asian Cup 2019. As a result, the Turkmenistan national team lost 2:3.

Career statistics

International

Statistics accurate as of match played 14 November 2019

International goals
Scores and results list Turkmenistan's goal tally first.

Honours
Aşgabat
 Ýokary Liga: 2007, 2008
HTTU
Ýokary Liga: 2013
Turkmenistan Cup: 2011

Lokomotiv Tashkent
 Uzbekistan Super Cup: 2019

Turkmenistan
AFC Challenge Cup runner-up: 2010, 2012

References

External links

1990 births
Living people
Turkmenistan footballers
Turkmenistan expatriate footballers
Turkmenistan international footballers
Association football midfielders
Expatriate footballers in Kazakhstan
Expatriate footballers in Uzbekistan
Turkmenistan expatriate sportspeople in Kazakhstan
Turkmenistan expatriate sportspeople in Uzbekistan
Footballers at the 2010 Asian Games
Kazakhstan Premier League players
FC Okzhetpes players
FC Irtysh Pavlodar players
FC AGMK players
FC Sogdiana Jizzakh players
PFK Nurafshon players
FC Aşgabat players
FC Ahal players
sri Pahang FC players
2019 AFC Asian Cup players
PFC Lokomotiv Tashkent players
Asian Games competitors for Turkmenistan